AfterBuzz TV is an online broadcast network that specializes in after-show podcasts for several television series including Game of Thrones, Big Brother, The Flash, Real Housewives, and Grey's Anatomy.

Created by Maria Menounos and produced by Keven Undergaro, the network was nicknamed the "ESPN of TV Talk" by AdWeek. On each of AfterBuzz’s TV after-show, a mix of celebrities, personalities, and industry professionals break down that night's episode, take calls from fans, and interview guests. The network produces over 100 hours of content per week. The network also produces "Spotlight On", an in-depth, long-form interview series with stars and show runners. 

As of July 10, 2020, the network is rumored to have ceased production of further podcasts due to the COVID-19 pandemic. There has been no announcement on its website or social media about when or if podcasts will resume.

History

Producer Keven Undergaro and Maria Menounos created the AfterBuzz TV network to discuss their favorite show, AMC's Breaking Bad, and create a space for fans to interact. In November 2013, AfterBuzzTV celebrated its 5,000th episode milestone. The network was one of the first adopters to provide their content directly on SoundCloud. It produced over 100 hours of content per week. Their Big Brother podcast was the No. 1 rated podcast on iTunes for that series. Their roster of hosts included over 400 people.

References

External links 

 "‘Extra’ Host Maria Menounos’ YouTube Channel Gives TV Fans an Online Forum"
 AfterBuzzTV

Sources

External links 

 

Podcasting companies
American entertainment websites